Burewala (Punjabi and ), is a city of Vehari District in Punjab, Pakistan. The city of Burewala is the headquarters of Burewala Tehsil, an administrative subdivision of the district. It is the 34th largest city of Pakistan by population.

History
Burewala is situated on the Dehli Multan Road. Sutlej River crosses Burewala near the towns Kachi Pakki, Jamlera and Sahuka. Shrine of Haji Sher Dewan Chawli Mashaikh is also situated in Dewan Sahib at a distance of 18 km. from Burewala. Prior to its settlement, the area was a jungle which was later populated by the Dhuddi tribe of Rajput. When the Pakpattan canal started operating in this area, people started to settle in villages as agriculture developed, resulting in jungles being cut to make way for cultivation fields. As this area was in 'Eastern Canal Division' so it was named village no. 118/EB (EB = Eastern Barr). In the northern side of Burewala tehsil, there are still signs of an old water canal which is now called Sukh Bias.

Etymology

The exact origin of Pakistan's name is known; however, there are different theories. One theory is that the city is named after a person named "Burha." He was, according to some people, 'Sikh'. The village is also called "Old Bura" or "Purana Boora." The people of this village constructed a well with a diameter of 8 feet and named it after their ancestor so it was called "Chah Boorhay wala" (Well of Burha). This well is now included in the P.I. Link canal. Due to this well the new city was named Burewala. In July 1976, Burewala was upgraded as a subdivision. The areas of Gaggo Mandi, Shaikh Fazal, Sahuka and Jamlera, Chak No.118/E.B were included in the subdivision.

Education 
Notable educational institutes in the city include:
University of Agriculture, Faisalabad, Burewala Campus

Barani Institute of Sciences, Burewala Campus
Knowledge Inn Preparatory School, Burewala Campus
National College of Commerce & Computer Sciences, Burewala Campus
Punjab College of Science, Burewala Campus
Research School International (Burewala Campus)
Superior University Lahore, Burewala Campus

Notable personalities

Hazrat Baba Haji Sher Dewan
Major Tufail Mohammad (Nishan-e-Haider)
International cricketer Waqar Younis, known as the Burewala express in cricket.
World's Tallest Cricketer Muhammad Irfan
Ancestral village of Rajesh Khanna.

References

Populated places in Vehari District
Populated places in Punjab, Pakistan
Tehsils of Punjab, Pakistan